Raiya Chak Maddu is a village in the union council of Monan Jhelum Tehsil. The village is part of the Jhelum District of the Punjab province of Pakistan.

Notable people
Most Honourable and known for his philanthropist work Ch Abdul Rashid father of Ch Mohammed Arshad who made the historical Road which links the village to the Town and Cantt area.

Syed Manzoor ul Hassan Hashmi (Late) Ex-Wing Commander PAF;

Gallery

References

Populated places in Jhelum District